Carlos Andrés Bejarano Palacios (born 29 January 1985) is a footballer who plays as a goalkeeper for Rionegro Águilas of the Colombian First Division.

Born and raised in Colombia, he has been naturalized by Equatorial Guinea and played for that national team, despite not complying with FIFA eligibility rules.

Honors

National titles
Liga Panameña de Fútbol: Apertura 2009 II

References

External links

1985 births
Living people
People from Quibdó
Equatoguinean people of Colombian descent
Colombian footballers
Naturalized citizens of Equatorial Guinea
Equatoguinean footballers
Equatorial Guinea international footballers
Association football goalkeepers
La Equidad footballers
C.D. Árabe Unido players
AS Trenčín players
Independiente Medellín footballers
Deportivo Pasto footballers
Águilas Doradas Rionegro players
América de Cali footballers
Categoría Primera A players
Categoría Primera B players
Liga Panameña de Fútbol players
Slovak Super Liga players
Colombian expatriate footballers
Colombian expatriate sportspeople in Slovakia
Colombian expatriate sportspeople in Panama
Expatriate footballers in Panama
Expatriate footballers in Slovakia
Sportspeople from Chocó Department